Nordmann is the demonym of the Norwegian people in its native language (see: Norman).

It is also a surname. Notable people with the surname include:
 Alexander von Nordmann (1803–1866), Finnish zoologist
 Armand von Nordmann (1759–1809), Austrian general of the Napoleonic era 
 Bevo Nordmann (1939–2015), American basketball player
 Charles Nordmann (1881–1940) French astronomer
 Johann Nordmann (1820–1887), Austrian journalist and travel writer
 Karl-Gottfried Nordmann (1915–1982), German World War II fighter pilot
 Theodor Nordmann (1918–1945), German World War II pilot

See also
 Norwegian people
 Nordman (disambiguation)

no:Nordmann